Christopher Columbus is a 1923 German silent historical film directed by Márton Garas and starring Albert Bassermann, Elsa Bassermann and Tamara Duvan. It depicts the Discovery of America by the Italian explorer Christopher Columbus in 1492.

Cast
In alphabetical order
 Albert Bassermann - Columbus
 Elsa Bassermann - Columbus's wife
 Tamara Duvan - Queen Isabella
 Arpad Odry
 Imre Pethes - King Ferdinand II.
 Ludwig Rethey - Guardian of La Rábida
 Ernst Stahl-Nachbaur - Duke of Medina-Celli
 Ferenc Szécsi - Diego
 Carola Toelle - Maria, Tochter des Herzogs

Bibliography
 Bergfelder, Tim & Bock, Hans-Michael. ''The Concise Cinegraph: Encyclopedia of German. Berghahn Books, 2009.

External links

1923 films
1920s historical films
1920s biographical films
German historical films
German biographical films
Films of the Weimar Republic
German silent feature films
Films directed by Márton Garas
Films set in the 1490s
Films set in Spain
Films set in pre-Columbian America
German black-and-white films
Age of Discovery films
Fiction set in 1492
Cultural depictions of Christopher Columbus
Silent adventure films
1920s German films